VIVA Model Management is a model agency based in Paris, London and Barcelona.  The agency was founded in Paris in 1988 by director Cyril Brule and focuses on high-fashion editorial and catwalk work.  VIVA's board features notable models, including Natalia Vodianova, Doutzen Kroes, Kirsty Hume, Raquel Zimmerman, Stella Tennant and Kaia Gerber.

As well as the shared women's division, both offices operate a "VIVA Talent" board.  Talents include French icons Ines de la Fressange, Isabelle Huppert and Laetitia Casta, and British actress Charlotte Rampling.

Models
Current models include:

Kesewa Aboah
Mica Argañaraz
Nora Attal
Nadja Auermann
Vanessa Axente
Małgosia Bela
Julia Bergshoeff
Edie Campbell
Sara Blomqvist
Olympia Campbell
Saskia de Brauw
Drake Burnette
Laetitia Casta
Demy de Vries
Andreea Diaconu
Dilone
Suvi Koponen
Doutzen Kroes
Bette Franke
Kaia Gerber
Imaan Hammam
Kirsty Hume
Constance Jablonski
Adrienne Jüliger
Liya Kebede
Ginta Lapiņa
Fernanda Ly
Giulia Maenza
Chaikra Shanti Maximus
Pooja Mor
Kati Nescher
Julia Nobis
Tatjana Patitz
Emily Ratajkowski
Aymeline Valade
Rianne Van Rompaey
Signe Veiteberg
Edita Vilkeviciute
Natalia Vodianova
Ari Westphal
Jacquetta Wheeler
Kiki Willems
Raquel Zimmermann
Aivita Muza

See also
 List of modeling agencies

Notes

External links
Official Website
 http://www.viva-paris.com
 https://www.instagram.com/vivamodel/
 https://www.lopinion.fr/edition/economie/cyril-brule-vivamodelmanagement-conditions-dans-lesquelles-nous-170467

Modeling agencies
Entertainment companies established in 1988
Companies based in Paris
French companies established in 1988